Eva & Adam (Eva och Adam) is a Swedish TV series consisting of two seasons. The original airdate for the first episode was 30 January 1999.

The show is about a boy, Adam Kieslowski, and a girl, Eva Strömdahl. Adam has Polish ancestry; his father is Polish. Eva is a Swedish girl. The two children live in Liljeholmen, a district of the Swedish capital Stockholm. During the show, Eva and Adam fall in love. Sometimes there are obstacles, but after a while (mostly in the second season) a true love has developed. Other storylines in the show include friendship and bullying.

The show is based on the comic books with the same name. There was also a successful feature film made, called Eva & Adam – fyra födelsedagar och ett fiasko (Eva & Adam: Four Birthdays and a Fiasco).

Adam Kieslowski 
Adam Kieslowski is played by Carl-Robert Holmer-Kårell.

Adam's father was born in Poland. In the first season, Adam is 12 years old, in the second season he is 13 years old and in the movie he is 14 years old.. Adam does not have any siblings.

Eva Strömdahl
Eva Strömdahl is played by Ellen Fjaestad.

Eva lives with her parents and her two brothers in a house. Just like Adam, Eva is 12 in the first season, in the second season she is 13 and in the movie she is 14.

Other characters
Tobbe Strömdahl
Annika
Alexander

Broadcast history
Eva & Adam has been broadcast in Scandinavia, Germany (Kika) and the Netherlands (Z@pp).

Sources
 https://www.imdb.com/name/nm0391732/
 Eva & Adam Central (Fansite)
 Eva och Adam (Strips)

References

External links

Sveriges Television original programming
Swedish children's television series
Television shows based on comics
2000s romance television series
1999 Swedish television series debuts
2001 Swedish television series endings